Marylhurst may refer to:

Marylhurst, Oregon, U.S.
Marylhurst University, in Marylhurst, Oregon, U.S.
Marylhurst Art Gym, at Marylhurst University